Thomas Macknight (15 February 1829 – 19 November 1899) was an Anglo-Irish newspaper editor, biographer and publisher. He was the originator of the Two Nations Theory in 1896, which argues that the Ulster Protestants are a distinct Irish nation.

Life
Born in Gainford in County Durham, the son of Thomas Macknight, and his wife, Elizabeth, Macknight was privately educated at Dr Bowman's school in Gainford. He enrolled in the Medical Faculty at King's College, London in 1849 where he met and was influenced by Frederick Denison Maurice. Macknight left the college in 1851 without taking his degree, having discovered an interest in journalism, and began his career by writing leaders for a number of London daily papers. He married the actress Sarah Thorne sometime between 1856 and 1859.  They had two children during their three years together, Edmund (b. 1860) and Elizabeth (b. 1862), but due to incompatibility the couple separated soon after the birth of their daughter. In January 1866 Macknight succeeded Frank Harrison Hill as editor of The Northern Whig in Belfast, where he remained for thirty-three years. Macknight was a Liberal and supported Gladstone's Irish land legislation; he admired Gladstone (who had helped him to publish his biography of Edmund Burke and there are several letters from him to Gladstone discussing Belfast politics in the Gladstone Papers at the British Library. MacKnight, however, opposed Gladstone's proposals for Home Rule, believing that Ireland's problems could only be resolved through legislation from Westminster.

A Unionist, Thomas Macknight's publications included A Literary and Political Biography of the Right Honorable Benjamin Disraeli, MP Richard Bentley, London (1854); The History of the Life and Times of Edmund Burke  in three volumes, Chapman and Hall, London (1856 to 1860); Life of Henry St. John, Viscount Bolingbroke (1863),  and Ulster As It Is or Thirty Years Experience as an Irish Editor (1896).

Following his death on 19 November 1899 Macknight was buried in Belfast City Cemetery.

Life

References

External links

On-line books by Macknight

1829 births
1899 deaths
Alumni of King's College London
19th-century Anglo-Irish people
Irish unionists
Irish newspaper editors
Irish biographers
Irish male non-fiction writers
Irish male writers
Male biographers
19th-century journalists
Male journalists
19th-century male writers
Burials at Belfast City Cemetery
People from Gainford, County Durham
19th-century Irish businesspeople